International Parkway is a major north–south highway in the Dallas–Fort Worth metroplex. Its main purpose is to provide access to Dallas/Fort Worth International Airport (DFW) from the metropolitan area. Part of the Parkway from its southern end at State Highway 183 (SH 183, Airport Freeway) and SH 360 to the South Toll Plaza for DFW Airport is designated as State Highway Spur 97. International Parkway is a de facto toll road, though the toll booths also handle parking fees for the airport.

Route description
The International Parkway starts at an interchange with SH 183 and SH 360 southwest of the 
Dallas/Fort Worth International Airport. From there it runs eastward on ramps parallel to SH 183 (Airport Freeway) before turning northward as Spur 97. The Spur 97 designation ends on the south side of the airport property before the parkway passes through a toll booth. The parkway runs across the airport property between the various terminal buildings. North of the terminals, the parkway passes through another toll booth before reaching an interchange with I-635, SH 114, and SH 121.

History
Spur 97 was designated on May 9, 1940, on a route from SH 77 to Marietta in Cass County as a renumbering of SH 245. This route was cancelled and became a portion of FM 250 on September 26, 1945. Spur 97 was redesignated on March 31, 1965, on a route from IH 610 and SH 225 to Lawndale Ave in Houston. The route became a portion of SH 225 on April 2, 1969, when it was extended westward, as old SH 225 to SH 35 became part of I-610.

The International Parkway opened to traffic on September 21, 1973; the current Spur 97 designation dates to July 30, 1974.

Tolls 
All vehicles traveling on International Parkway, including those destined for the airport terminals, are required to pay a toll. The tolls operate on a ticket-based system and are payable by cash, credit or debit card, or TollTag upon exiting. Toll rates mirror the fees for Terminal Parking and are based on time spent between the toll plazas. 

The high toll rate for vehicles spending less than 8 minutes on airport property is targeted at commuters using the highway as a shortcut. It was raised from $4 to $6 on October 1, 2019.

The at-grade service roads parallel to International Parkway provide a free alternative for vehicles passing through the airport property. However, they do not provide access to the airport terminals.

Exit list

See also

References

International Parkway
State highway spurs in Texas
Toll roads in Texas
Euless, Texas
Dallas/Fort Worth International Airport